The 2020 Colgate Raiders football team represented Colgate University in the 2020–21 NCAA Division I FCS football season. They were led by seventh-year head coach Dan Hunt and played their home games at Crown Field at Andy Kerr Stadium. They are a member of the Patriot League.

On July 13, 2020, the Patriot League announced that it would cancel its fall sports seasons due to the COVID-19 pandemic. The league announced a spring schedule on February 5, with the first games set to be played on March 13.

Schedule
Colgate had games scheduled against Western Michigan on September 4, and Cornell on October 17, which were later canceled before the start of the 2020 season.

References

Colgate
Colgate Raiders football seasons
Colgate Raiders football
College football winless seasons